Reginald George Boden (13 September 1884 – 11 February 1966) was an English cricketer. Boden's batting style is unknown. He was born at Ashby-de-la-Zouch, Lancashire.

Boden made a single first-class appearance for Lancashire against Cambridge University at Fenner's in 1907. Cambridge University won the toss and elected to bat first, making 366 all out. Lancashire were then dismissed for just 97 in their first-innings, with Boden being dismissed for 5 runs by Harold Goodwin. Forced to follow-on in their second-innings, Lancashire were dismissed for just 65, with Boden scoring 3 runs before he was again dismissed by Goodwin. Cambridge University won the match by an innings and 204 runs. This was his only major appearance for Lancashire.

He died at Bowness-on-Windermere, Cumberland, on 11 February 1966.

References

External links
Reginald Boden at ESPNcricinfo
Reginald Boden at CricketArchive

1884 births
1966 deaths
People from Ashby-de-la-Zouch
Cricketers from Leicestershire
English cricketers
Lancashire cricketers